Shaffin Ahmedali Sumar (born 26 May 1971) is a Tanzanian CCM politician and Member of Parliament for Tabora North constituency since 2010.

References

1971 births
Living people
Chama Cha Mapinduzi MPs
Tanzanian MPs 2010–2015
Aga Khan Mzizima Secondary School alumni
Tanzanian politicians of Indian descent
Uyui Secondary School alumni